The Quiksilver Pro Gold Coast 2014 was an event of the Association of Surfing Professionals for 2014 ASP World Tour.

This event was held from 1 March to 12 March at Snapper Rocks, Coolangatta, Queensland Australia and contested by 36 surfers.

The tournament was won by Gabriel Medina (BRA), who beat Joel Parkinson (AUS) in final.

Round 1

Round 2

Round 3

Round 4

Round 5

Quarter finals

Semi finals

Final

References
 Site ASP

Surfing competitions
2014 in surfing
2014 in Australian sport
Sport on the Gold Coast, Queensland
Quiksilver Pro Gold Coast